wic, from the Old English suffix "-wic", can refer to a -wich town.

WIC may also stand for:

Organizations 
Walta Information Center, a news agency based in Ethiopia
Dutch West India Company, a Dutch merchant trading company of the 17th and 18th centuries
West Indies College, the former name of the Northern Caribbean University
West Island College, two private schools in Canada
Western International Communications, a former Canadian media company acquired by CanWest Global Communications in 2000
Wittgenstein Centre for Demography and Global Human Capital, a research collaboration located in Vienna
Women's Industrial Council (active 1894-c.1917), British feminist organisation
World In Common, a libertarian-left political project
World Internet Conference, an annual international event, first held in 2014, organized by government agencies in China to discuss global Internet issues and policies.

Computing 
WAN Interface Card, a specialized computing network interface card that enables devices to connect to a Wide Area Network
Windows Imaging Component, a software component of Microsoft Windows
Windows Integrity Control (also known as Mandatory Integrity Control), a security mechanism introduced in Microsoft's Windows Vista operating system
Women in computing
World in Conflict, a 2007 real-time strategy computer game by Massive Entertainment

Transport
 WIC, the National Rail station code for Wickford railway station, Basildon, England
 WIC, the IATA airport code for Wick Airport

Other uses 
 County Wicklow, Ireland, Chapman code
WIC (Women, Infants and Children), the United States federal Special Supplemental Nutrition Program for Women, Infants and Children
Walk-in closet
Washington International Competition, a competition held by the Friday Morning Music Club based in Washington, D.C.

nl:WIC